Starting Out is an Australian television soap opera made for the Nine Network by the Reg Grundy Organisation in 1983.

Background 
The five-night-a-week series was created by Reg Watson as the network's replacement for the long-running  serial The Young Doctors. It was produced by Sue Masters who had also been the producer of The Young Doctors.  
 
It was set at a medical college with an emphasis on young people getting their first experience of living away from home and leading independent lives. Starting Out debuted 18 April 1983 and aired in an early evening slot before the network's news service.

Cast 

The youthful cast included:

 Leander Brett – Aggie Dean
 Antoinette Byron – Laurel Adams
 David Clencie – Ben McNamara
 Nikki Coghill – Margot Fallon-Smith 
 Tottie Goldsmith – Trixie Sheldon
 Rowena Mohr – Michelle Rivers
 Julie Nihill – Tessa Staples
 Peter O'Brien – Craig Holt
 David Reyne – Paul Harding
 Yves Stenning – Will Brodie
 Gary Sweet – Rod Turner
 Paul Williams – Peter Nolan

The more experienced cast members complementing the young leads included:

 Maurie Fields – Mac Rankin
 Suzy Gashler – Yvonne Rivers
 Caroline Gillmer – Eleannor Harris
 John Grant – Dr. Greg Munro
 Jill Forster – Dr. Judith Holt 
 John Hamblin – Dr. James Holt
 Gerard Maguire – Dr. John Rivers
 Anne Phelan – Mrs. De Soosa
 Marie Redshaw – Mrs. Lynch
 Colin Vancao – Russell Dean

Cancellation 
The series failed to gain sufficient ratings and was quickly cancelled and removed from network schedules by 20 May 1983. Some of the unaired episodes were screened sporadically out-of-ratings in late 1983. Not until a late night repeat run during the later half of 1989 several years after production did all of the 85 produced episodes go to air.

External links
 
Starting Out at the National Film and Sound Archive

Notes

Australian television soap operas
Nine Network original programming
1983 Australian television series debuts
1983 Australian television series endings
English-language television shows
Television series produced by The Reg Grundy Organisation